The 2003–04 New Jersey Nets season was the Nets' 37th season in the National Basketball Association, and 28th season in East Rutherford, New Jersey. After speculating that he would sign with the defending champion San Antonio Spurs in the off-season, Jason Kidd signed a 6-year, $99 million deal to stay with the Nets.

The team acquired All-Star center and two-time Defensive Player of the Year Alonzo Mourning, who missed all of last season due to his worsening kidney condition. However, after just twelve games, Mourning retired on November 25, 2003, due to complications from his kidney disease.

After a 22–20 start to the season, Byron Scott was fired as head coach and was replaced with Lawrence Frank, as the Nets went on a 14-game winning streak at midseason. With Frank as interim head coach, the Nets overcame adversity, ending the season with a 47–35 record. Despite this, the Nets still managed to repeat as Division Champions and earn the number 2 spot in the Eastern Conference.

After sweeping the New York Knicks in the opening round of the playoffs, the second round pitted the Nets against the Detroit Pistons in last year's Conference championship rematch. However, Detroit would get revenge this time, and would eventually win the series in seven games, ending the 2003–04 season for the Nets. The Pistons would go on to defeat the Los Angeles Lakers in the 2004 NBA Finals to win their third NBA championship.

Following the season, Kenyon Martin was traded to the Denver Nuggets, Kerry Kittles was traded to the Los Angeles Clippers, and Rodney Rogers signed as a free agent with the New Orleans Hornets. Martin and Kidd both represented the Eastern Conference at the 2004 NBA All-Star Game, which was held in Los Angeles. This was Kenyon Martin's only All-Star game appearance.

Offseason

Draft picks

Roster

Roster notes
 Center Alonzo Mourning retired on November 25.

Regular season

Season standings

z – clinched division title
y – clinched division title
x – clinched playoff spot

Record vs. opponents

Game log

Playoffs

|- align="center" bgcolor="#ccffcc"
| 1
| April 17
| New York
| W 107–83
| Richard Jefferson (21)
| Kenyon Martin (12)
| Jason Kidd (13)
| Continental Airlines Arena18,206
| 1–0
|- align="center" bgcolor="#ccffcc"
| 2
| April 20
| New York
| W 99–81
| Kenyon Martin (22)
| Kenyon Martin (16)
| Jason Kidd (8)
| Continental Airlines Arena19,918
| 2–0
|- align="center" bgcolor="#ccffcc"
| 3
| April 22
| @ New York
| W 81–78
| Martin, Kidd (19)
| Kenyon Martin (15)
| Richard Jefferson (10)
| Madison Square Garden19,763
| 3–0
|- align="center" bgcolor="#ccffcc"
| 4
| April 25
| @ New York
| W 100–94
| Kenyon Martin (36)
| Kenyon Martin (13)
| Jason Kidd (7)
| Madison Square Garden19,763
| 4–0
|-

|- align="center" bgcolor="#ffcccc"
| 1
| May 3
| @ Detroit
| L 56–78
| Kerry Kittles (15)
| Jason Kidd (7)
| Jason Kidd (6)
| The Palace of Auburn Hills22,076
| 0–1
|- align="center" bgcolor="#ffcccc"
| 2
| May 7
| @ Detroit
| L 80–95
| Jefferson, Martin (19)
| Jason Collins (10)
| Jason Kidd (11)
| The Palace of Auburn Hills22,076
| 0–2
|- align="center" bgcolor="#ccffcc"
| 3
| May 9
| Detroit
| W 82–64
| Richard Jefferson (30)
| Kenyon Martin (9)
| Jason Kidd (12)
| Continental Airlines Arena19,000
| 1–2
|- align="center" bgcolor="#ccffcc"
| 4
| May 11
| Detroit
| W 94–79
| Jason Kidd (22)
| Kenyon Martin (15)
| Jason Kidd (11)
| Continental Airlines Arena19,860
| 2–2
|- align="center" bgcolor="#ccffcc"
| 5
| May 14
| @ Detroit
| W 127–120 (3OT)
| Richard Jefferson (31)
| Jefferson, Kittles (11)
| Jason Kidd (8)
| The Palace of Auburn Hills22,076
| 3–2
|- align="center" bgcolor="#ffcccc"
| 6
| May 16
| Detroit
| L 75–81
| Richard Jefferson (23)
| Jefferson, Martin (7)
| Jason Kidd (8)
| Continental Airlines Arena19,968
| 3–3
|- align="center" bgcolor="#ffcccc"
| 7
| May 20
| @ Detroit
| L 69–90
| Kerry Kittles (18)
| Kenyon Martin (12)
| Jason Kidd (7)
| The Palace of Auburn Hills22,076
| 3–4
|-

Player statistics

Regular season

|Richard Jefferson
|82
|82
|38.2
|.498
|.364
|.763
|5.7
|3.8
|1.1
|0.3
|18.5
|-
|Kenyon Martin
|65
|62
|34.6
|.488
|.280
|.684
|9.5
|2.5
|1.5
|1.3
|16.7
|-
|Jason Kidd
|67
|66
|36.6
|.384
|.321
|.827
|6.4
|9.2
|1.8
|0.2
|15.5
|-
|Kerry Kittles
|82
|82
|34.7
|.453
|.351
|.787
|4.0
|2.5
|1.5
|0.5
|13.1
|-
|Alonzo Mourning
|12
|0
|17.9
|.465
|
|.882
|2.3
|0.7
|0.2
|0.5
|8.0
|-
|Rodney Rogers
|69
|15
|20.4
|.410
|.329
|.765
|4.4
|2.0
|0.9
|0.4
|7.8
|-
|Lucious Harris
|69
|15
|21.8
|.404
|.376
|.846
|2.0
|2.0
|0.6
|0.0
|6.9
|-
|Aaron Williams
|72
|7
|18.6
|.503
|.333
|.677
|4.1
|1.1
|0.5
|0.6
|6.3
|-
|Jason Collins
|78
|78
|28.5
|.424
|.000
|.739
|5.1
|2.0
|0.9
|0.7
|5.9
|-
|Brian Scalabrine
|69
|2
|13.4
|.394
|.244
|.829
|2.5
|0.9
|0.3
|0.2
|3.5
|-
|Zoran Planinic
|49
|1
|9.7
|.411
|.281
|.633
|1.1
|1.4
|0.3
|0.1
|3.1
|-
|Brandon Armstrong
|56
|0
|7.8
|.371
|.365
|.500
|0.8
|0.3
|0.2
|0.0
|2.7
|-
|Tamar Slay
|22
|0
|7.5
|.350
|.333
|.500
|1.1
|0.6
|0.3
|0.0
|2.4
|-
|Robert Pack
|26
|0
|8.5
|.423
|
|.833
|0.7
|1.0
|0.5
|0.0
|1.9
|-
|Doug Overton
|6
|0
|3.7
|.375
|
|1.000
|0.2
|0.7
|0.2
|0.0
|1.3
|-
|Damone Brown
|3
|0
|5.7
|.100
|
|.500
|1.7
|0.0
|0.7
|0.0
|1.0
|-
|Anthony Goldwire
|6
|0
|3.2
|.250
|.000
|
|0.2
|0.2
|0.3
|0.0
|0.7
|-
|Mikki Moore
|4
|0
|2.5
|.200
|
|
|0.5
|0.0
|0.0
|0.0
|0.5
|-
|Hubert Davis
|14
|0
|3.9
|.111
|
|1.000
|0.6
|0.2
|0.1
|0.0
|0.3
|}

Playoffs

|-
|Richard Jefferson
|11
|11
|41.8
|.418
|.273
|.713
|6.3
|3.8
|1.3
|0.7
|19.8
|-
|Kenyon Martin
|11
|11
|37.2
|.533
|.000
|.750
|11.0
|1.1
|1.2
|1.3
|19.1
|-
|Kerry Kittles
|11
|11
|37.7
|.448
|.327
|.618
|4.3
|2.1
|2.0
|0.9
|14.4
|-
|Jason Kidd
|11
|11
|43.1
|.333
|.208
|.811
|6.6
|9.0
|2.3
|0.5
|12.6
|-
|Rodney Rogers
|11
|0
|20.7
|.319
|.227
|.800
|5.0
|1.1
|0.5
|0.3
|6.1
|-
|Lucious Harris
|11
|0
|16.5
|.388
|.250
|.778
|2.0
|0.9
|0.6
|0.1
|5.0
|-
|Aaron Williams
|11
|0
|13.5
|.545
|
|.600
|2.0
|0.4
|0.0
|0.6
|3.8
|-
|Jason Collins
|11
|11
|24.2
|.368
|
|.750
|4.0
|1.5
|0.3
|0.9
|3.6
|-
|Brian Scalabrine
|9
|0
|8.1
|.647
|.833
|.500
|1.3
|0.1
|0.3
|0.0
|3.3
|-
|Brandon Armstrong
|8
|0
|4.0
|.250
|.000
|
|0.3
|0.4
|0.1
|0.0
|0.8
|-
|Tamar Slay
|6
|0
|2.0
|.200
|.000
|1.000
|0.3
|0.0
|0.2
|0.0
|0.7
|-
|Zoran Planinic
|6
|0
|2.5
|.000
|.000
|.500
|0.2
|0.3
|0.0
|0.0
|0.2
|}
Player Statistics Citation;

Awards and records
 Jason Kidd, All-NBA First Team
 Jason Kidd, NBA All-Defensive Second Team
 Nenad Krstić, NBA All-Rookie Team 2nd Team

Transactions

Free agents

See also
 2003–04 NBA season

References

External links
 

New Jersey Nets season
New Jersey Nets seasons
New Jersey Nets
New Jersey Nets
21st century in East Rutherford, New Jersey
Meadowlands Sports Complex